"Heart of Gold" is a song written and recorded by Force & Styles. It was first recorded and released on Force & Styles album All over the UK (1996) with the vocals by Jenna, and it was released as a single in 1998 with vocals by Kelly Llorenna. It is one of the most well known hardcore songs and was used as the name of Force & Styles's greatest hits album Heart of Gold. In 2002, Llorenna released a new version as her fourth solo single produced by Flip & Fill.

Force & Styles version
The original version was a happy hardcore song with vocals by Jenna Barr. It was released as a one sided 12" promo on United Dance Recordings and this is the version which appears on Force & Styles's first album All over the UK and their greatest hits album Heart of Gold (2000).

In 1998 the song was released as a single on Diverse records. The new versions had additional production by Eliot Kennedy, Mike Percy and Tim Lever of Steelworks Productions to make the song more commercial. Force & Styles also produced a new version as well with vocals by Kelly Llorenna for the single.

Track listings
12-inch promo (1996)
 "Heart of Gold" (feat. Jenna) – 7:59

CD single (1998)
 "Heart of Gold" (feat. Kelly Llorenna) – 4:23
 "Heart of Gold" (Rated PG Premier mix) – 7:23
 "Heart of Gold '98" (feat. Kelly Llorenna) – 7:45

12-inch single 1 (1998)
 "Heart of Gold '98" (feat. Kelly Llorenna) – 7:45
 "Heart of Gold" (original mix) (feat. Jenna) – 7:59

12-inch single 2 (1998)
 "Heart of Gold" (extended mix)  (feat. Kelly Llorenna) 
 "Heart of Gold" (Ruff Driverz club mix) 
 "Heart of Gold" (Rated PG club mix)

Personnel
Force & Styles 
 Paul Hobbs – producer
 Darren Mew – producer

Production
 Steelworks Productions (Eliot Kennedy, Mike Percy, Tim Lever) - producers (on 1998 single version)

Additional musicians
 Jenna Barr – vocals
 Kelly Llorenna – vocals (on 1998 single version)
 Colin Brett – guitar (on 1998 single version)

Other personnel
 Mark Yates – design

Charts

Kelly Llorenna version

Llorenna re-recorded and released the song as her fourth solo single on 18 November 2002. It was produced by Flip & Fill and reached number 19 on the UK Singles Chart.

Track listings
CD single
 "Heart of Gold" (radio edit) – 3:03
 "Heart of Gold" (Flip & Fill remix) – 6:37
 "Heart of Gold" (DJ Demand remix) – 6:47

12-inch single
 "Heart of Gold" (Flip & Fill remix) – 6:37
 "Heart of Gold" (Infextious remix) – 6:46
 "Heart of Gold" (Hixxy's remix) – 6:42

12-inch promo
 "Heart of Gold" (Flip & Fill remix) – 6:37
 "Heart of Gold" (DJ Demand remix) – 6:47
 "Heart of Gold" (Infextious remix) – 6:46
 "Heart of Gold" (Hixxy's remix) – 6:42
 "Heart of Gold" (Kenny Hayes remix) – 6:40

Personnel
 Kelly Llorenna – vocals

Production
 Flip & Fill – producer
 Lee Monteverde – mixing

Other personnel
 Ignition – design

Charts

References

External links
 Force & Styles – 
 Kelly Llorenna – 
 Kelly Llorenna – 

1996 songs
1998 singles
2002 singles
Force & Styles songs
Songs written by Darren Styles
Song recordings produced by Eliot Kennedy